The Minziro (Nature) Forest Reserve is a  conservation area along the Kagera River in Bukoba district of northwestern Tanzania. It protects one of the largest forests in Tanzania, of a forest type that is unique in the country. The forest is continuous with the Malabigambo Forest over the nearby Uganda border. The largest part consists of Baikiaea–Podocarpus seasonal swamp forests while the remainder is flooded acacia woodlands.

Wildlife
The Minziro Forest is similar to forests found in the Congo and Guinea, and consequently it contains flora and fauna that reach their eastern range limits here. 

Characteristic trees of swamp forests include Afrocarpus dawei, Heywoodia lucens, Mussaenda erythrophylla, Cassipourea ruwensorensis, Citropsis articulata, Manilkara obvata, Baikiaea insignis, and Uncaria africana.

58 of the 245 bird species recorded in the reserve are not found outside Kagera in Tanzania, while 56 of these have only been seen in Minziro. In addition, more than 600 butterfly species are native here, surpassing any other forest in Africa.

Threats

The forest was formerly extensively logged for the valuable Afrocarpus dawei trees, which are now scarce, with only small specimens remaining. Illegal logging is ongoing.

Pastoralists have been entering the central grasslands illegally in search of grazing. They burn the grasslands which is detrimental to the over-wintering population of blue swallows, and also affects vegetation in the forest-grassland ecotone. In 2017 the Bukoba magistrate's court fined one trespassing pastoralist, and expressed dismay at the escalating damage to the environment.

References

Bukoba
Forest reserves of Tanzania
Geography of Kagera Region
Nature reserves in Tanzania
Protected areas established in 1947
Victoria Basin forest–savanna mosaic
Important Bird Areas of Tanzania